Union Bank Farm Halt railway station was on the southern section of the St Helens and Runcorn Gap line of the London and North Western Railway.

History
On 1 October 1911 the London and North Western Railway (LNWR) introduced a steam railmotor service between Widnes and St Helens, and at the same time, opened two new halts along the route:  and Union Bank Farm Halt.

The halt was built in wood and could fairly be described as 'minimal'.

The halt closed on 18 June 1951, when passenger trains were withdrawn between Widnes and St Helens.

Services
In 1922 six "Down" (northbound) trains a day called at Ann Street Halt, 'One class only' (i.e. 3rd Class) and 'Week Days Only' (i.e. not Sundays). The "Up" service was similar. The trains' destinations were St Helens to the north and Ditton Junction to the south, with some travelling beyond to Runcorn or Liverpool Lime Street.

In 1951 the service was sparser. Four trains called in each direction, Monday to Friday. On Saturdays three trains called in each direction, all were 3rd Class only. No trains called on Sundays.

References

Notes

Sources

External links
The station on a 1937-1961 Overlay OS Map via National Library of Scotland
Union Bank Farm Halt on navigable 1948 O.S. map

an illustrated history of the line via 8D Association

Disused railway stations in St Helens, Merseyside
Former London and North Western Railway stations
Railway stations in Great Britain opened in 1911
Railway stations in Great Britain closed in 1951